Thanga Mama 3D is a 1985 Indian Tamil-language film directed by K. Simon, starring Arun and Sasikala. It was released on 6 September 1985.

Plot

Cast 
Arun
Sasikala
M. N. Nambiar

Production 
Thanga Mama 3D is the second 3D film made in Tamil film industry after Annai Bhoomi 3D.

Soundtrack 

The soundtrack was composed by Ilaiyaraaja.

References

External links 
 

1985 3D films
1980s Tamil-language films
1985 films
Films scored by Ilaiyaraaja
Indian 3D films